The Accusation is a 2021 French courtroom drama film directed by Yvan Attal. The screenplay, written by Attal and Yaël Langmann, is an adaptation of Karine Tuil's 2019 novel of the same name. It had its world premiere on 9 September 2021 at the 78th Venice International Film Festival, and was released in France by Gaumont Film Company on 1 December 2021.

Plot
Alexandre Farel is the son of the prominent television presenter Jean Farel. Claire, his mother, left Jean and lives with Adam Wizman, who is also separated from his Orthodox Jewish wife with whom he has a daughter, Mila. When Alexandre returns from finishing his studies in the United States, he accompanies his mother for an evening and meets Mila. Together they go to a party for former students of the Lycée Henri-IV. The next day, the police arrest Alexandre, who has been accused of rape by Mila. He denies the charge and argues that the act was consensual. The event sends the families into a breakdown as their lives are torn apart by the trial.

Cast
 Ben Attal as Alexandre Farel
 Suzanne Jouannet as Mila Wizman
 Charlotte Gainsbourg as Claire Farel
 Mathieu Kassovitz as Adam Wizman
 Pierre Arditi as Jean Farel
 Audrey Dana as Valérie Berdah
 Benjamin Lavernhe as Maître Arthur Célerier
 Judith Chemla as Mila's lawyer
 Hervé Temime as Maître Lancel
 Franz-Rudolf Lang as Maître Rozenberg
 Réjane Kerdaffrec as Anne Collet
 Gérard Watkins as Avocat Général
 Laetitia Colombani as Psychologist
 Jean-Charles Piette as Expert Psychiatrist
 Marie Dompnier as Madame Vallet
 Jean-Toussaint Bernard
 Romain Cottard
 Zakariya Gouram
 Laëtitia Eïdo as Yasmina Vasseur
 Camille Razat as Quitterie
 Emmanuelle Lepoutre
 Anne Bouvier as Madame Ballard
 Marie-Bénédicte Roy as Marianne
 Joaquim Fossi
 Angèle Metzger
 Fahmi Guerbaa
 Julie Fournier as Florence Laplace
 Fabrice Drouelle

Production

The screenplay is inspired by the novel Les Choses humaines by Karine Tuil, published in the summer of 2019, which notably won the Prix Interallié and the Prix Goncourt des Lycéens. Karine Tuil herself was inspired by a news story that occurred on the Stanford University campus (the 2015 rape case of Stanford student Brock Turner) to write the novel.

Yvan Attal directs his partner Charlotte Gainsbourg in the film as well as their son, Ben Attal — both of whom already starred in his previous film, My Dog Stupid, released in 2019.

Principal photography began in August 2020. Filming especially took place in the courthouse of Créteil (Val-de-Marne). Filming took place in Paris until 7 November 2020.

Release
The Accusation had its world premiere on 9 September 2021 at the 78th Venice International Film Festival. The film was also screened at 47th Deauville American Film Festival on 11 September 2021. It was theatrically released in France by Gaumont Film Company on 1 December 2021.

Reception

Box office
The film sold 182,074 admissions in France, grossing a domestic total of $1.3 million.

Critical response
On Rotten Tomatoes, the film holds an approval rating of 86% based on 7 reviews, with an average rating of 8.3/10.

Jordan Mintzer of The Hollywood Reporter wrote, "The film tends to overstay its welcome, mostly because Attal doesn't know when to cut a scene short, or otherwise cut away, and let us think for ourselves".

Accolades

References

External links
 
 
 

2021 films
2021 drama films
2020s French films
2020s French-language films
2020s legal drama films
Films about rape in France
Films based on French novels
Films directed by Yvan Attal
Films shot in Île-de-France
Films shot in Paris
France 2 Cinéma films
French courtroom films
French drama films
Gaumont Film Company films